Thandalam is a emerging location of the Chennai city in the Sriperumbudur taluk of Kancheepuram district, Tamil Nadu, India. It is in the National Highway 4 (NH-4)  or State Highway 84 (SH-84) at Sira Bypass. It is the village near the Chembarambakkam lake.
The village is the birthplace of Tamil Thendral Thiru. V. Kalyanasundaram

References 

Villages in Kanchipuram district

ta:ஸ்ரீபெரும்புதூர் வட்டம்